Bhadralok (literally 'gentleman', or 'well-mannered person') is Bengali for the new class of 'gentlefolk' who arose during British rule in India in the Bengal region in the eastern part of the Indian subcontinent.

Caste and class makeup
According to Sekhar Bandyopadhyay, the Bhadraloks primarily, though not exclusively, belonged to "the three traditional upper castes of Bengal", Brahmin, Baidya and Kayastha. Wealth, English education, and high status in terms of administrative service were the factors which led to the rise of this 'new aristocracy' and since a large number of the three upper castes had administrative skills and economic advantages, they formed the majority of Bhadralok in 19th century Bengal, but the Bhadralok "was never a closed status group", rather in practice it was an open social group. Majority of the Brahmins and Kayasthas being poor and illiterate were not regarded as Bhadralok. By late 19th century many of middle ranking peasant and trading castes, who had gained affluency, had entered the rank of Bhadralok .

Economy 
Among others, Joya Chatterji, Lecturer in History of Modern South Asia at Cambridge and Fellow of Trinity College, accuses the Bhadralok class for the economic decline of the state of West Bengal after India's independence in 1947. She writes in her book, titled "The Spoils of Partition":In these ways, Bengal's partition frustrated the plans and purposes of the very groups who had demanded it. Why their strategy failed so disastrously is a question which will no doubt be debated by bhadralok Bengal long after the last vestiges of its influence have been swept away. Many excuses have already been made; and different scapegoats remain to be identified and excoriated. But perhaps part of the explanation is this: for all their self-belief in their cultural superiority and their supposed talent for politics, the leaders of bhadralok Bengal misjudged matters so profoundly because, in point of fact, they were deeply inexperienced as a political class. Admittedly, they were highly educated and in some ways sophisticated, but they had never captured the commanding heights of Bengal's polity or its economy. They had been called upon to execute policy but not to make it. They had lived off the proceeds of the land, but had never organised the business of agriculture. Whether as theorists or practitioners, they understood little of the mechanics of production and exchange, whether on the shop-floor or in the fields. Above all, they had little or no experience in the delicate arts of ruling and taxing people. Far from being in the vanguard as they liked to believe, by 1947 Bengal's bhadralok had become a backward-looking group, living in the past, trapped in the aspic of outdated assumptions, and so single-mindedly focused upon their own narrow purposes that they were blind to the larger picture and the big changes that were taking place around them.

Politics 
The polity and politics of West Bengal was dominated by bhadraloks despite their lesser numerical presence in the state. All Chief Ministers of West Bengal since 1947 were from the social group that was denoted as Bhadraloks.

Popular culture 
Bhadralok class is copiously referred in the popular Bengali literature including in the novel and stories of Saratchandra Chattopadhyay and Rabindranath Tagore. Kaliprasanna Singha sarcastically criticized the class' social attitude and hypocrisy during its accession to prominence in the nineteenth century in his famous book, titled Hootum Pyanchar Naksha.

In the 1990s and 2000s, Chandrabindoo brings forward the class' dilemma and hypocritical attitude in their songs including Sokale Uthiya Ami Mone Mone Boli, Amar Modhyobitto Bheeru Prem, Amra Bangali Jaati and many more.

See also
Christianity in West Bengal
Bengal Renaissance
Nastanirh
Gentleman

References

Subho Basu and Sikata Banerjee, 'The Quest for Manhood: Masculine Hinduism and Nation in Bengal in Comparative Studies of South Asia, Africa and the Middle East
Bhadralok in Banglapedia
Indira Choudhuri, The Fragile Hero and Virile History: Gender and the Politics of Culture, (New Delhi: Oxford University Press, 1998).
Tithi Bhattacharya, The Sentinels of Culture: Class, Education and the Colonial Intellectual in Bengal, (New York: Oxford University Press, 2007).

Cultural history of Bangladesh
Social anthropology
Social class in India
Bengal Presidency
Bengali culture
Bengali words and phrases